Mardi Rustam (born ca. 1931) is an American film producer and director.

He graduated from the University of Chicago with a degree in Business Administration. He also earned a Bachelor of Fine Arts from the Arts Institute/Goodman Theatre of Chicago and a Master of Fine Arts in Cinema from USC.

Rustam became the founder and president of the movie company Mars Productions in the 1960s. He has produced and directed more than 20 movies and TV productions in the US and abroad. One of his movies is the horror flick Evils of the Night, starring Julie Newmar and Tina Louise.  He also acted in three of his movies.

He and his wife, Sarah, have 2 grown daughters.

In 1994, Rustam was honored with the Service Award by the Academy of Science Fiction, Fantasy & Horror Films, USA.

A member of the Producers Guild of America, he also became publisher and editor-in-chief of the Tolucan Times, one of the oldest newspapers in the San Fernando Valley, and Entertainment Today. He also joined the Los Angeles Press Club.

In the summer of 1998, he was honored by The United Chambers of Commerce of the San Fernando Valley with its Small Business of the Year Award.

Mardi Rustam lives in Toluca Lake, California, with his wife.

His granddaughter, Brittany Lee, is following in his footsteps. Her first short film, A Book By Its Cover, was in the San Fernando Valley International Film Festival.  The film was chosen out of 500 submissions and was placed at No. 6.

Filmography

External links

The Rustam Report

1931 births
American film producers
American film directors
Living people
University of Chicago Booth School of Business alumni
USC School of Cinematic Arts alumni